Dactyloscopus is a genus of sand stargazers native to the coasts of the Americas.

Species
There are currently 20 recognized species in this genus:
 Dactyloscopus amnis R. R. Miller & Briggs, 1962 (Riverine stargazer)
 Dactyloscopus boehlkei C. E. Dawson, 1982
 Dactyloscopus byersi C. E. Dawson, 1969 (Notchtail stargazer)
 Dactyloscopus comptus C. E. Dawson, 1982
 Dactyloscopus crossotus Starks, 1913 (Bigeye stargazer)
 Dactyloscopus elongatus G. S. Myers & Wade, 1946
 Dactyloscopus fallax C. E. Dawson, 1975
 Dactyloscopus fimbriatus (Reid, 1935)
 Dactyloscopus foraminosus C. E. Dawson, 1982 (Reticulate stargazer)
 Dactyloscopus heraldi C. E. Dawson, 1975
 Dactyloscopus insulatus C. E. Dawson, 1975
 Dactyloscopus lacteus (G. S. Myers & Wade, 1946) (Milky sand stargazer)
 Dactyloscopus lunaticus C. H. Gilbert, 1890 (Moonstruck stargazer)
 Dactyloscopus metoecus C. E. Dawson, 1975 (Mexican stargazer)
 Dactyloscopus minutus C. E. Dawson, 1975 (Tiny stargazer)
 Dactyloscopus moorei (Fowler, 1906) (Speckled stargazer)
 Dactyloscopus pectoralis T. N. Gill, 1861 (Whitesaddle stargazer)
 Dactyloscopus poeyi T. N. Gill, 1861 (Shortchin stargazer)
 Dactyloscopus tridigitatus T. N. Gill, 1859 (Sand stargazer)
 Dactyloscopus zelotes D. S. Jordan & C. H. Gilbert, 1896

References

 
Dactyloscopidae
Taxa named by Theodore Gill
Marine fish genera